The Municipality of Centre Hastings is a township in Eastern Ontario, Canada, in Hastings County. It was formed on January 1, 1998, through the amalgamation of Huntingdon Township with the Village of Madoc.

Communities
The municipality of Centre Hastings comprises a number of villages and hamlets, including the following communities such as Crookston, Fuller, Ivanhoe, Madoc, Moira, West Huntingdon, West Huntingdon Station; Buller Siding (partially), Fuller Station, Ivanhoe Station, Moira Lake, Roslin, White Lake

Demographics 

Mother tongue:
 English as first language: 95.5%
 French as first language: 0.9%
 English and French as first language: 0%
 Other as first language: 3.6%

See also
List of townships in Ontario

References

External links

Lower-tier municipalities in Ontario
Municipalities in Hastings County